Anqasi (Quechua for cobalt salt, Hispanicized spellings Ancasi, Anccase, Anccasi, Angasi) may refer to:

 Anqasi, a mountain in the La Unión Province, Arequipa Region, Peru
 Anqasi (Ayacucho), a mountain in the Ayacucho Region, Peru
 Anqasi (Caylloma), a mountain in the Caylloma Province, Arequipa Region, Peru